Monsieur Papa may refer to:
 Monsieur Papa (2011 film), a French film
 Monsieur Papa (1977 film), a French comedy film